Jason Chong (born 29 October 1969) is an Australian actor.

Chong was born in Sydney, Australia. He graduated from the National Institute of Dramatic Art (NIDA), Australia. He is frequently seen on television; his credits include: Wildside, Bondi Banquet, Murder Call, Going Home, Farscape, All Saints and Maximum Choppage. In 2006, Chong played a news reporter in the American horror movie, See No Evil.

He plays the recurring role of General Kasar in Netflix's series Marco Polo.

Chong played the lead Chinese role of Zhang Lin in Sydney Theatre Company's 2017 production of Chimerica at the Roslyn Packer Theatre.

External links

References

1969 births
Australian people of Chinese descent
Australian male film actors
Australian male television actors
Living people
Male actors from Sydney
National Institute of Dramatic Art alumni